This is a list of the butterflies of China belonging to the family Hesperiidae and an index to the species articles. This forms part of the full list of butterflies of China. 365 species or subspecies of Hesperiidae are recorded from China.

Hesperiidae
genus: Abraximorpha
Abraximorpha davidii (Mabille, 1876) 
A. d. davidii Sichuan, Shaanxi, Hubei, Zhejiang, Jiangxi, Anhui
Abraximorpha esta  Evans, 1949  Yunnan
Abraximorpha heringi  Liu & Gu, 1994 Liu & Gu, 199
Abraximorpha pieridoides  Mell, 1922  Hainan
genus: Aeromachus
Aeromachus piceus Leech, 1894 Sichuan, Yunnan
Aeromachus stigmata (Moore, 1878) Yunnan
A. s. obsoleta (Moore, 1878)
Aeromachus monstrabilus Huang, 2003 Tibet
Aeromachus dubius Elwes & Edwards, 1897 Hainan, Yunnan
Aeromachus pseudojhora Lee, 1962 Yunnan
Aeromachus inachus (Menetries, 1859) Amur
Aeromachus kali  De Niceville, 1895 
Aeromachus catocyanea (Mabille, 1879) 
A.c. catocyanea
A.c. amplifascia  Huang, 2003  Yunnan
A.c. curvifascia  Huang, 2003  Yunnan
Aeromachus propinquus tali  Evans, 1932
genus: Ampittia
Ampittia trimacula (Leech, 1891) West China
Ampittia dioscorides (Fabricius, 1793)
A. d. etura (Mabille, 1891 Yunnan
Ampittia virgata (Leech, 1890)
Ampittia nanus (Leech, 1890) Ningpo
Ampittia dalailama (Mabille, 1876) West China, Tibet
Ampittia sichunanensis  Z.G. Wang & Y. Niu, 2002
genus: Arnetta
Arnetta atkinsoni  (Moore, 1878) 
genus: Astictopterus
Astictopterus jama C. & R. Felder, 1860
genus: Badamia
Badamia exdamationis  (Fabricius, 1775)
genus: Baoris
Baoris farri  (Moore, 1878)
Baoris leechii  (Elwes & Edwards, 1897) 
genus: Barca
Barca bicolor  (Oberthür, 1896)
genus: Bibasis
Bibasis gomata lara (Leech, 1894) Yunnan
Bibasis sena uniformis Elwes & Edwards, 1897 Hainan
Bibasis amara (Moore, [1866]) Yunnan
Bibasis aquilina (Speyer, 1879) South China
Bibasis striata (Hewitson, 1867) West China
Bibasis unipuncta Lee, 1962 Yunnan
genus: Burara
Burara amara  (Moore, [1866])
genus: Caltoris
Caltoris bromus (Leech, 1894)  Sumatra, Java, Lesser Sundas, Borneo, Palawan, Philippines
Caltoris cahira  (Moore, 1877)
C. c. carina  (Evans, 1937) Yunnan
C. c. austeni  (Moore, [1884])
Caltoris septentrionalis  Koiwaiya, 1996 China
Caltoris sirius  (Evans, 1926) Tibet
Caltoris tulsi  (de Nicéville, [1884]) India to Malaya, Java, China.
genus: Carcharodus
Carcharodus flocciferus  (Zeller, 1847)  Xinjiang
genus: Carterocephalus
Carterocephalus silvicola (Meigen, 1829) Amurland
Carterocephalus palaemon (Pallas, 1771)
Carterocephalus argyrostigma Eversmann, 1851 North-east China
Carterocephalus dieckmanni Graeser, 1888
Carterocephalus christophi Grum-Grshimailo, 1891 Tibet
Carterocephalus alcina Evans, 1939 Yunnan
Carterocephalus alcinoides Lee, 1962 Yunnan
Carterocephalus avanti (de Nicéville, 1886) Tibet, West China
Carterocephalus flavomaculatus Oberthür, 1886 Tibet, West China
Carterocephalus houangty Oberthür, 1886
C. h. shoka  Evans, 1915 Tibet, West China
C. h. jiuzaikouensis Yoshino, 2001 Sichuan
C. h. zorgensis Yoshino, 2003 Sichuan
Carterocephalus micio Oberthür, 1891 China
Carterocephalus niveomaculatus Oberthür, 1886 Tibet, West China
Carterocephalus pulchra Leech, 1891) Tibet, West China
Carterocephalus abax Oberthür, 1886 Tibet
Carterocephalus habaensis Yoshino, 1997 Yunnan
genus: Celaenorrhinus
Celaenorrhinus vietnamicus Devyatkin, 1998 Yunnan
Celaenorrhinus aspersa Leech, 1891
Celaenorrhinus nigricans nigricans (de Niceville, 1885) 
Celaenorrhinus dhanada  affinis  Elwes & Edwards, 1897
Celaenorrhinus consanguinea consanguinea Leech, 1891 
Celaenorrhinus patula  de Nicéville, 1889
Celaenorrhinus ratna nujiangensis Huang, 2001 
Celaenorrhinus tibetana  Mabille, 1876 
genus: Cephrenes
Cephrenes acalle  Hopffer, 1874 
genus: Choaspes
Choaspes benjaminii japonica  (Murray, 1875)  Northwest Yunnan
Choaspes furcatus Evans, 1932 Hainan
Choaspes plateni stigmata Evans, 1932 Hainan
Choaspes xanthopogon (Kollar, [1844]) West China
genus: Coladenia
Coladenia agni  (de Nicéville, [1884]) Hainan
Coladenia agnioides  Elwes & Edwards, 1897 southern China
Coladenia buchananii  (de Nicéville, 1889) (de Nicéville, [1889])
Coladenia laxmi sobrina  Elwes & Edwards, 1897 Hainan
Coladenia maeniata  Oberthür, 1896 Yunnan, China
Coladenia uemurai  H. Huang, 2003  Yunnan
genus: Ctenoptilum
Ctenoptilum vasava  (Moore, [1866]) 
genus: Daimio
Daimio tethys (Menetries, 1857) Amurland, Ussuri
D. t. birmana Evans, 1926 Yunnan
genus: Erionota
Erionota thrax  (Linnaeus, 1767) 
Erionota torus  Evans, 1941 
Erionota grandis  (Leech, 1890) West China
genus: Erynnis
Erynnis montanus (Bremer, 1861)
Erynnis tages (Linnaeus, 1758)
Erynnis popoviana Nordmann, 1851
Erynnis pelias  (Leech, 1891) West China
genus: Gerosis
Gerosis phisara (Moore, 1884)
 G. p. rex ( Evans, 1949) Yunnan
Gerosis sinica  (C. & R. Felder, 1862) South and Central China, Yunnan
 G. S. narada  (Moore, 1884)  Yunnan
Gerosis yuani  Huang, 2003 Yunnan
genus: Halpe
Halpe aucma  Swinhoe, 1893  Tibet
Halpe dizangpusa  Huang, 2002  Jiu-Hua Shan, Min-Yuan Bamboo Forest.
Halpe gamma  Evans, 1937  China, Formosa
Halpe handa  Evans, 1949  Yunnan
Halpe hauxwelli  Evans, 1937  Yunnan
Halpe knyvetti  Elwes & Edwards, 1897 Tibet
Halpe kumara   Yunnan
  H. k. micromacula  (H. Huang, 2003) Dulong valley, NW. Yunnan
Halpe mixta  Huang, 2003  Yunnan
Halpe molta  Evans, 1949  Tibet
Halpe muoi  Huang, 1999  Yunnan
Halpe nephele  Leech, 1893  Sichuan,
Halpe ormenes  (Plötz, 1886 Yunnan
Halpe parakumara  Huang, 2003 
Halpe paupera  Devyatkin, 2002  Hong Kong
Halpe porus  (Mabille, 1877)  West China, Hong Kong, Hainan
Halpe zema  (Hewitson, 1877)  Yunnan
genus: Hasora
Hasora anura (de Niceville, 1889) Yunnan
H. A. china  Evans, 1949
Hasora badra ( Moore, 1857) West China
Hasora chromus (Cramer, 1782) South China
Hasora danda  Evans, 1949 West China
Hasora vitta indica  Evans, 1932
genus: Hesperia
Hesperia comma mixta  Alphéraky, 1881 Tian-Shan
Hesperia florinda (Butler, 1878) Amurland, Ussuri
genus: Heteropterus
Heteropterus morpheus (Pallas, 1771) Amurland
genus: Hyarotis
Hyarotis adrastus (Cramer, 1780)
genus: Idmon
Idmon bicolora  Fan, X.L & Wang, M., 2007 
Idmon flavata  Fan, X.L & Wang, M., 2007 
Idmon fujianana  (Chou & Huang, 1994)
Idmon sinica  (H. Huang, 1997)
genus: Isoteinon
Isoteinon lamprospilus C. & R. Felder,
genus: Leptalina
Leptalina unicolor (Bremer & Grey, 1853) East China, Amurland
genus: Lobocla
Lobocla liliana (Atkinson, 1871) Yunnan
Lobocla bifasciata (Bremer & Grey, 1853) China
Lobocla simplex (Leech, 1891) West China
Lobocla germanus (Oberthür, 1886) China
Lobocla contractus (Leech, 1893)
Lobocla proximus (Leech, 1891) West China, Tibet
Lobocla nepos (Oberthür, 1886) West China
genus: Lotongus
Lotongus saralus  (de Nicéville, 1889) 
  L. s. chinensis  Evans, 193  Szechwan
  L. s. quinquepunctus Joicey & Talbot, 1921 Hainan

genus: Matapa
genus: Muschampia
Muschampia staudingeri (Speyer, 1879) West China
Muschampia proteus (Staudinger, 1886) Tian-Shan
Muschampia lutulenta (Grum-Grshimailo, 1887) Tian-Shan
Muschampia kuenlunus (Grum-Grshimailo, 1893) Tian-Shan
Muschampia protheon (Rambur, 1858) Central China
Muschampia gigas (Bremer, 1864) East China, Amurland
Muschampia cribrellum (Eversmann, 1841) Amurland
Muschampia antonia (Speyer, 1879) Tian-Shan, Tibet
genus: Notocrypta
Notocrypta clavata (Staudinger, 1889) 
 N. c. clavata
 N. c. theba  Evans, 1949 South Yunnan
Notocrypta paralysos  asawa  Fruhstorfer, 1911 Hainan
Notocrypta curvifascia   (C. & R. Felder, 1862) 
Notocrypta feisthamelii 
N. f. rectifasciata Leech West China
N. f. alysosMoore, 1865 
Notocrypta ariannae  Gallo, E. & Bozano, G.C. 2017
genus: Ochlodes
Ochlodes sylvanus (Esper, 1777)
Ochlodes venata (Bremer & Grey, 1853) Amurland to Southeast China
Ochlodes ochracea (Bremer, 1861) Amurland to Southeast China
Ochlodes subhyalina (Bremer & Grey, 1853)
Ochlodes thibetana (Oberthür, 1886) Tibet
Ochlodes bouddha (Mabille, 1876) China
Ochlodes lanta Evans 1939
genus: Ochus
Ochus subvittatus  Moore, 1878
genus: Odontoptilum
Odontoptilum angulata angulata (C. Felder, 1862) 
genus: Onryza
Onryza maga  (Leech, 1890) China
Onryza meiktila  (de Nicéville, 1891)
Onryza perbella  Hering, 1918  China
genus: Oriens
Oriens goloides  (Moore, [1881]) South China 
Oriens gola  (Moore, 1877)  
genus: Parnara
Parnara guttatus Bremer & Grey, 1853
P. g. guttatus (Bremer & Grey, 1853 North China
P. g. mangala (Moore, [1865]) South China
Parnara batta Evans, 1949 South-east China
Parnara apostata hulsei Devyatkin & Monastyrskii, 1999 South Yunnan
genus: Pelopidas
Pelopidas jansonis  (Butler, 1878)
Pelopidas mathias (Fabricius, 1798)
Pelopidas sinensis (Mabille, 1877)
Pelopidas grisemarginata  Yuan , Zhang & Yuan, 2010 
genus: Pithauria
genus: Polytremis
Polytremis lubricans (Herrich-Schäffer, 1869) Tibet, Yunnan
Polytremis flavinerva Chou & Zhou, 1994 Guangxi
Polytremis choui Huang, 1994 Fujian
Polytremis discreta  (Elwes & Edwards, 1897) 
Polytremis mencia (Moore, 1877) Shanghai
Polytremis kiraizana (Sonan, 1938)
Polytremis pellucida (Murray, 1875)
P. p. quanta  Evans, 1949 Guniujiang, Anhui
P. p. inexpecta Tsukiyama, Chiba & Fujioka, 1997 Zhejiang
Polytremis theca (Evans, 1937)
P. t. theca (Evans, 1937) Sichuan, Shaanxi
P. t. fukia (Evans, 1940) Fujian, Anhui
P. t. macrotheca Huang, 2003 Yunnan
Polytremis zina (Evans, 1932)
Polytremis gigantea Tsukiyama, Chiba & Fujioka, 1997 Sichuan
Polytremis caerulescens (Mabille, 1876) West China
Polytremis micropunctata Huang, 2003 Yunnan
Polytremis nascens (Leech, [1893]) Sichuan
Polytremis suprema Sugiyama, 1999 Guangxi
Polytremis matsuii Sugiyama, 1999 Sichuan
Polytremis gotama Sugiyama, 1999 Yunnan
Polytremis jigongi  J.Q. Zhu , Z.B. Chen & L.Z. Li, 2012
genus: Potanthus
Potanthus pseudomaesa (Moore, [1881])
P. p. pseudomaesa (Moore, [1881]) Yunnan
P. p. clio (Evans, 1932)
Potanthus palnia (Evans, 1914)
P. p. palnia (Evans, 1914) Yunnan, Hainan, Guangxi, Fujian, Tibet
Potanthus trachala phoebe (Evans, 1934) Anhui, Jiangxi, Hunan, Sichuan, Fujian, Hainan 
P. t. tytleri  (Evans, 1914)
Potanthus pallidus (Evans, 1932) South China
Potanthus juno (Evans, 1932) Zhejiang
Potanthus confucius (C. & R. Felder, 1862)
P. c. confucius (C. & R. Felder, 1862) Zhejiang, Fujian, Anhui, Hubei, Guangdong, Hunan
P. c. dushta (Fruhstorfer, 1911) Hainan
Potanthus mara Evans, 1932 Tibet
Potanthus pava pava (Fruhstorfer, 1911) Fujian, Hubei
Potanthus lydia (Evans, 1934) West China
Potanthus riefenstahli Huang, 2003 Yunnan
Potanthus mingo ajax (Evans, 1932) Yunnan
Potanthus ganda (Fruhstorfer, 1911) Yunnan, Guangxi, Hainan
Potanthus flava (Murray, 1875) Jilin, Hebei, Shandong, Hunan, Fujian, Yunnan
Potanthus nesta (Evans, 1934)
P. n. nesta (Evans, 1934) Yunnan
P. n. omeia Lee, 1962 Sichuan
Potanthus taqini Huang, 2001 Tibet
Potanthus tibetana Huang, 2002 Tibet, Yunnan
Potanthus yani Huang, 2002 Anhui, Fujian
Potanthus rectifasciata  (Elwes & Edwards, 1897)
genus: Pseudoborbo 
Pseudoborbo bevani (Moore, 1878) 
genus: Pseudocoladenia
Pseudocoladenia dan (Fabricius, 1787)
Pseudocoladenia dea  (Leech, 1894)  South China (Zhejiang, Anhui, Hubei, Sichuan)
Pseudocoladenia festa  (Evans, 1949) Southwest China (Yunnan, Sichuan)
Pseudocoladenia fatua  (Evans, 1949) Tibet
genus: Pyrgus
Pyrgus alpinus (Erschoff, 1874) West China
Pyrgus maculatus thibetanus (Oberthür, 1891) West China
Pyrgus malvae (Linnaeus, 1758)
Pyrgus alveus (Hübner, 1802)
Pyrgus serratulae (Rambur, 1839) China
Pyrgus alveus Hübner, [1800-1803]
P. a. reverdini (Oberthür, 1912) Ta-tsien-lou, Sichuan
P. a. schansiensis Reverdin, 1915
Pyrgus speyeri (Staudinger, 1887) Amurland
Pyrgus oberthueri (Leech, 1891) West China, Tibet
Pyrgus bieti (Oberthür, 1886) West China, Tibet
genus: Sarangesa
Sarangesa dasahara  (Moore, [1866])
genus: Satarupa
Satarupa nymphalis (Speyer, 1879)
Satarupa splendens Tytler, 1914 Yunnan
Satarupa valentini Oberthür, 1921 Tibet
Satarupa monbeigi  Oberthür, 1921 
genus: Scobura
Scobura cephaloides (de Nicéville, [1889]) Hainan
Scobura coniata  Hering, 1918 
genus: Sebastonyma
Sebastonyma medoensis  Lee, 1979 
 S. m. medoensis 
 S. m. albostriata H. Huang, 2003 Nujiang valley, N.W. Yunnan
genus: Seseria
genus: Sovia
Sovia lucasii  (Mabille, 1876) 
S. l. magna Evans, 1932 
Sovia separata ( Moore, 1882)  Tibet
Sovia albipectus  (de Nicéville, 1891)
Sovia subflava (Leech, 1894)  West Sichuan, Northwest Yunnan
Sovia grahami  (Evans, 1926) 
S. g. grahami Tibet
S. g. miliaohuae Huang, 2003  Northwest Yunnan
Sovia fangi  Huang & Wu, 2003 Northwest Yunnan
genus: Spialia
Spialia galba chenga Evans, 1956 Hainan
Spialia sertorius (Hoffmannsegg, 1804) Tibet, Amurland
Spialia orbifer lugens (Staudinger, 1886) Tian-Shan
genus: Stimula
Stimula swinhoei   swinhoei   Elwes & Edwards, 1897
genus: Suastus
Suastus gremius  (Fabricius, 1798)
Suastus minuta  (Moore, 1877) 
genus: Tagiades
Tagiades litigiosa  Moschler, 1878  Hainan, Yunnan
Tagiades menaka  (Moore, [1866])  Hainan
genus: Taractrocera
Taractrocera flavoides Leech, 1894 
Taractrocera tilda  Evans, 1934 
genus: Telicota
Telicota colon (Fabricius, 1775)
Telicota augias (Linnaeus, 1763)
Telicota linna  Evans, 1949
Telicota ancilla (Herrich-Schäffer, 1869)
genus: Thymelicus
Thymelicus lineola (Ochsenheimer, 1808) Amurland
Thymelicus alaica (Filipjev, 1931) Tian-Shan
Thymelicus leonina (Butler, 1878) South China, Amurland
Thymelicus sylvatica (Bremer, 1861) South China, Amurland
Thymelicus nervulata (Mabille, 1876) West China
genus: Thoressa many
Thoressa baileyi  (South, 1914)  Southwest China
 T. b. baileyi  (South, 1913) 
Thoressa bivitta  (Oberthür, 1886)  West Sichuan, North Yunnan
Thoressa blanchardii blanchardii  (Oberthür, 1886)  West Sichuan
Thoressa fusca fusca  (Elwes, [1893])  Southwest China Yunnan, Tibet
  T.f. fusca 
  T.f. senna  Evans, 1937 
Thoressa gupta  gupta   (de Niceville, 1886)  Sichuan, Guangdong, Yunnan
  T.g. gupta 
  T.g. nujiangensis  (H. Huang, 2003) Nujiang valley, Northwest Yunnan
Thoressa hyrie  (de Niceville, 1891)  Tibet
Thoressa kuata  (Evans, 1940)  Southeast China (Fujian, Zhejiang)
Thoressa latris  (Leech, 1893)  Southwest China (Sichuan, Yunnan)
Thoressa luanchuanensis  (Wang & Niu, 2002)  Central China (Henan, Hubei)
Thoressa masuriensis  (Moore, 1878)  West China (North Yunnan, West Sichuan)
 T. m. tali  (Swinhoe, [1912]) 
 T. m. cuneomaculata  Murayama, 1995
Thoressa pandita  (de Niceville, 1885) Southwest China, Southeast Tibet
Thoressa serena  (Evans, 1937) Sichuan, Yunnan
Thoressa submacula  (Leech, 1890) West China
Thoressa viridis  (Huang, 2003) Yunnan
Thoressa xiaoqingae  Huang & Zhan, 2004  Guangdong, Hainan
Thoressa yingqii  (Huang, 2011) Central China (Shaanxi)
Thoressa zinnia  (Evans, 1939) North Yunnan

genus: Udaspes
genus: Zographetus
Zographetus satwa  (de Nicéville, [1884])  Hainan
Zographetus hainanensis  Fang & Wan, 2007  China (Hainan)
Zographetus doxus  Eliot, 1959  China (Hainan)
Zographetus ogygioides Elwes & Edwards, 1897  
Zographetus pangi Fan & Wang, 2007

References

Chou, Io (ed) 1994. Monographia Rhopalocerorum Sinensium (Monograph of Chinese Butterflies). Henan Scientific and Technological Publishing House, Zhengzhou. (in Chinese). . Lists species plus new distribution records for China. New species descriptions are noted in English. Colour photographs of the species treated, with accompanying Chinese text.
Full list references.

External links
Catalogue of life China List provided by Chinese Academy of Sciencesonline
Butterflies of China at Digital moths of Japan. Includes images.
Wikispecies taxonomy additional references via species or genus
Acta Zootaxonomica Sinica

Lists of butterflies of China